Sanaya or alternatively Sanaia may refer to:

People

Sanaia
Giorgi Sanaia, sometimes Giorgi Sanaya (1975–2001), Georgian television journalist

Sanaya
Anzor Sanaya (born 1989), Russian footballer 
Sanaya Irani (now Sehgal) (born 1983), Indian actress
Sanaya Pithawalla (born 4 August 1993) is an Indian model and actress
Valter Sanaya (1925–1999), Soviet footballer
Zurab Sanaya (born 1968), Russian footballer and football coach